This is a comprehensive listing of official releases by Alexis & Fido, a Puerto Rican reggaeton duo.

Albums

Studio albums

Compilation albums
2006: Los Reyes Del Perreo

Singles

Collaborations

Videography

References

Reggaeton discographies
Discographies of Puerto Rican artists